Sirjan County is in Kerman province, Iran. The capital of the county is the city of Sirjan. At the 2006 census, the county's population was 239,455 in 58,253 households. The following census in 2011 counted 267,697 people in 73,560 households. At the 2016 census, the county's population was 324,103 in 95,357 households.

Administrative divisions

The population history and structural changes of Sirjan County's administrative divisions over three consecutive censuses are shown in the following table. The latest census shows five districts, 10 rural districts, and seven cities.

References

 

Counties of Kerman Province